, better known by his stage name J, is a Japanese musician, singer, songwriter and record producer. He is best known as bassist and co-founder of the rock band Luna Sea since 1986. After they disbanded in 2000 he focused on his solo career, for which he performs lead vocals and bass. He rejoined Luna Sea when they reunited in August 2010.

Since 1997, J has had prominent names in the music industry playing either on his albums, as his backing band, or showing up as guests at some of his concerts including Raymond Watts (PIG), Ray McVeigh (Zilch), Takashi Fujita (Doom), Scott Garrett, Billy Duffy and Ian Astbury (all three from The Cult), Steve Jones (The Sex Pistols), Duff McKagan and Slash (both from Velvet Revolver), Franz Stahl (Scream, Foo Fighters) and Youjeen (Cherry Filter).

Career

1986–2009: Luna Sea and solo debut
During middle school through high school J became good friends with Inoran, and in 1986 they formed a band called Lunacy. In 1991, Lunacy changed their name to Luna Sea and released their first album. They went on to become very successful, having sold more than 10 million certified units in Japan, and are considered one of the most influential bands in the visual kei movement.

As a teenager, J was a roadie for thrash metal band Aion for about two years. The members of Luna Sea later provided backing vocals on Aion's 1991 album Aionism. In 2008, J played bass on five songs for the self-titled debut album of Aion leader Izumi's death metal band, The Braincase.

In 1993, J teamed up with Inoran and X Japan guitarist hide to form the group M*A*S*S. Their only material released was the song "Frozen Bug" on the sampler Dance 2 Noise 004 (the song would later be remixed by hide and put on his debut solo album Hide Your Face). J signed with Universal Music Group in 1997 and put out his first single called "Burn Out" on June 25, which contained a cover of the Blondie hit song "Call Me". His debut album Pyromania was released on July 24 and reached number 9 on the Oricon chart.

In 1999, he remixed Zilch's song "Electric Cucumber" for their remix album, Bastard Eyes. J later performed and toured with Zilch in 2001.

J did some arranging, writing and composing work on Youjeen's albums and singles released 2001–2002, together with Franz Stahl. In 2002, he played bass on the track "I Hate You" for Tomoyasu Hotei's album Scorpio Rising. Hotei later remixed J's song "Perfect World" for the "Go Crazy" single.

J participated in the making of South Korean musician Seo Taiji's 2004 album 7th Issue, by playing bass. Since November 9, 2005, starting with the "Break" single, J has been signed to Blowgrow a division of Avex Group. J covered Buck-Tick's song "Iconoclasm" for their tribute album, Parade -Respective Tracks of Buck-Tick-, which was released on December 21, 2005. Later on September 8, 2007, he performed at "Buck-Tick Fest 2007 on Parade", the finale of the tour for the album.

In 2006, he played bass in a collaboration with other musicians the song "Pursuit", under the name Aggressive Dogs Death Note Allstars "N-Crew", on the Death Note manga's tribute album, Death Note Tribute.

On December 24, 2007, J reunited with Luna Sea for their concert God Bless You ~One Night Dejavu~ at the Tokyo Dome. The band would reunite and perform again at the hide memorial summit on May 4, 2008, along with X Japan, Oblivion Dust, Takanori Nishikawa, and many more. In April 2009, J made the announcement, in his fan club issued Pyro Magazine Vol.21, that he had gotten married.

2010–present: Luna Sea reunion
In August 2010, he appeared with the other members of Luna Sea at a press conference in Hong Kong, where they officially announced their reunion and their 20th Anniversary World Tour Reboot -to the New Moon-.

To celebrate his 14-year anniversary as a solo artist, J released the self cover album Fourteen -The Best of Ignitions- in January 2011. March 8, was the debut of Pink Spider, a musical based on and featuring hide's music, which J performed a supporting role in. The production ran from March 8 to the 27 at the Tokyo Globe Theater and was then brought to Fukuoka, Kobe, Nagoya, Niigata, Sendai, and Sapporo in April. From May 5 to 9, J held five consecutive concerts at Shibuya-AX titled J 14th Anniversary Special Live Set Fire Get Higher -Fire Higher 2011-, each day with different bands such as Mass of the Fermenting Dregs, Nothing's Carved in Stone, Avengers in Sci-Fi, Pay Money to My Pain and The Hiatus.

On August 10, 2013, J began a series of concerts titled Tokyo 10 Days!! - 5 Months a Blaze -, which had him performing two consecutive nights in five locations, in five months. This is in addition to his nationwide tour J Live Tour 2013 - Believe in Yourself - from August 24 to October 27, 2013, which included 11 shows in 10 different cities. The band also participated at the year's Rock in Japan Festival and Monster Bash. J released his ninth studio album, Freedom No.9. on October 23. His former support guitarist masasucks appears on the album, as does drummer Masuo Arimatsu from Back Drop Bomb. The album was released on vinyl on April 19, 2014 for Record Store Day. Takashi Fujita, J's backing guitarist since he launched his solo career in 1997, retired at the end of the year and masasucks officially returned in his place. In spring 2015, J held a short tour and announced a new album was nearly completed. Eternal Flames was released on September 2, 2015.

J's eleventh studio album, Limitless, was released on July 24, 2019. He collaborated with Takanori Nishikawa on the songs "Real×Eyez", the theme song he composed for the Kamen Rider Zero-One TV series, and "Another Daybreak", the theme song he composed for the Kamen Rider Reiwa: The First Generation film. Both tracks were released as a single on January 22, 2020. The two musicians collaborated again on "A.I. ∴ All Imagination" for 2020's Kamen Rider Zero-One the Movie: Real×Time.

Equipment
J was endorsed by ESP Guitars for 28 years until May 2019. His many signature model bass guitars with the brand, most of which had his trademark phrase "WAKE UP! MOTHER FUCKER" painted on them, have sold over 50,000 copies. Before the contract expired, the special event "J × ESP 28 Years Trajectory ~28 Toshi no Kiseki~" followed his spring tour displaying his signature models and other goods. At the end of May 2019, it was announced that he had signed an endorsement contract with Fender. They gave him a custom model based on the Fender Precision Bass. Based on that specific custom model that he had been using, J's signature model was released on August 12, 2020. Regardless of endorsements, J uses various different brands when recording.

Support band
  – guitar 2009–present (Nunchaku, Superhype)
 masasucks – guitar 2005–2008, 2015–present (The Hiatus, Fullscratch)
   – drums 2016–present (Kemuri, Back Drop Bomb, Pontiacs)

Former members
 Franz Stahl – guitar 1997, 1999–2005 (Scream, Wool, Foo Fighters)
  – guitar 1997–2014 (Doom)
 Scott Garrett – drums 1997–2016 (The Cult, Dag Nasty, Wired All Wrong)

Discography
Albums
 Pyromania (July 24, 1997), Oricon Albums Chart Peak Position: #9
 Blood Muzik (December 27, 2001) #34
 Unstoppable Drive (November 27, 2002) #18
 Red Room (May 19, 2004) #24
 Glaring Sun (December 7, 2005) #39
 Urge (March 14, 2007) #39
 Ride (April 23, 2008) #36
 On Fire (March 21, 2012) #24
 Freedom No.9 (October 23, 2013) #31
 Eternal Flames (September 2, 2015) #15
 Limitless (July 24, 2019) #33
 Lightning (November 3, 2021) #17

EPs
 Igniter #081 (July 18, 2002)
 Crack Tracks (August 21, 2002) #28
 Go with the Devil -Crack Tracks II- (July 9, 2003) #26
 Stars From The Broken Night (August 5, 2009) #20
 Here Comes Nameless Sunrise (December 16, 2009) #36

Live albums
 The Live -All of Urge- (December 19, 2007) #62

Compilation albums
 Blast List -The Best of- (December 22, 2004) #43
 Fourteen -The Best of Ignitions- (January 26, 2011, self-cover) #28
 J 20th Anniversary Best Album ＜1997-2017＞ W.U.M.F. (March 22, 2017) #41

Singles
 "Burn Out" (June 25, 1997), Oricon Singles Chart Peak Position: #6
 "But You Said I'm Useless" (October 22, 1997) #31
 "Perfect World" (July 25, 2001) #19
 "Go Crazy" (March 20, 2002) #23
 "Feel Your Blaze" (October 30, 2002) #17
 "Nowhere" (April 14, 2004) #18
 "Get Ready" (July 6, 2005) #32
 "Break" (November 9, 2005) #22
 "Fly Away/Squall" (July 12, 2006) #43
 "Twister" (February 7, 2007) #24
 "Walk Along ~Infinite Mix~" (August 22, 2007) #42
 "Reckless" (March 19, 2008) #31
 "Now and Forever" (June 30, 2018, limited single)
 "Real×Eyez" (January 22, 2020, credited to J×Takanori Nishikawa) #8
 "My Heaven/A Thousand Dreams" (August 12, 2020)

Home videos
 Pyromania Tour'97 ~Crime Scene~ (VHS: October 22, 1997, DVD: December 18, 2002)
 Film The Blood Muzik 80min. Riot (June 26, 2002), Oricon DVDs Chart Peak Position: #34
 The Judgment Day -2003.1.4. Live at Budokan- (March 26, 2003) #51
 Blast List -The Clips- (December 22, 2004) #158
 Crazy Crazy ~Live & Document~ (March 26, 2006) #59
 Crazy Crazy II ~Road on Flames~ (December 6, 2006) #48
 Live And Let Ride (April 2009)
 Crazy Crazy III -With The Unfading Fire- (March 17, 2010) #49
 -Complete Clips- (November 13, 2012) #220, Oricon Blu-rays Chart Peak Position: #84
 Crazy Crazy IV -The Flaming Freedom- (March 26, 2014) #147, #121
 Crazy Crazy V -The Eternal Flames- (March 16, 2016) #99, #57
 J 20th Anniversary Live Film [W.U.M.F.] -Tour Final at EX Theater Roppongi 2017.6.25- (November 15, 2017) #45, #17
 J Live Streaming Akasaka Blitz 5 Days Final -Thank You to All Mother Fuckers-  (February 10, 2021) #38, #16

With Luna Sea

Other work
 M*A*S*S; Dance 2 Noise (1993) - "Frozen Bug"
 Nav Katze; Out (1994) - bass on 
 hide; Hide Your Face (1994) - composer (as part of M*A*S*S) on "Frozen Bug '93 (Diggers Version)"
 Zilch; Bastard Eyes (1999) - remixed 
 Zilch; "Charlie's Children" (2001) - bass on track 3
 Zilch; Skyjin (2001) - bass on tracks 1–3, 5, 8, 11 & 13
 Youjeen; "Hey Jerks" (2001) - arrangement & bass on all tracks; lyricist on tracks #1 & 3; composer on track #2
 Youjeen; "Someday" (2001) - arrangement, bass, guitar, lyricist and composer on all tracks
 Youjeen; The Doll (2001) - arrangement & bass on all tracks except #12; guitar on tracks #1, 4, 6, 8-11; lyricist on all tracks except #4, 10, & 12; composer on all tracks except #2, 3, 5, 7 & 12
 Youjeen; "Beautiful Days" (2001) - arrangement & bass on all tracks; lyricist on tracks #1 & 2; composer & guitar on tracks # 1 & 3
 Tomoyasu Hotei; Scorpio Rising (2002) - bass on "I Hate You"
 Dice; One (2003) - producer
 Seo Taiji; 7th Issue (2004) - bass
 Various artists; Parade -Respective Tracks of Buck-Tick- (2005) - "Iconoclasm"
 Various artists; Death Note Tribute (2006) - "Pursuit"
 The Braincase; The Braincase (2008) - bass on tracks #3, 4, 7, 9 & 11
 Aggressive Dogs;  (2009) - bass on "Seize the Day"
 Various artists;  (2009) - bass on 
 Various artists; Jack Rocks (2010) - "Miss Dizzy"
 Tokyo Girls' Style; "Get The Star / Last Forever" (2013) - composer on tracks 1 & 2
 Various artists; hide Tribute VII -Rock Spirits- (2013) - "Flame"
 minus(-); G (2015) - guest vocals on "Peepshow"
 lynch.; Sinners (2017) - bass on "Trigger"

References

External links
 Official website
 Official YouTube
 Signature ESP guitars

1970 births
Living people
Luna Sea members
Visual kei musicians
Japanese male singer-songwriters
Japanese male rock singers
Japanese alternative rock musicians
Japanese rock bass guitarists
Japanese punk rock musicians
People from Hadano, Kanagawa
Musicians from Kanagawa Prefecture
Avex Group artists
Male bass guitarists
21st-century bass guitarists